Summer Edward (born 10 March 1986) is a Trinidadian American writer, children's editor, educator, literary activist and children's literature specialist based in the USA. In 2010, at the age of 24, she founded Anansesem ezine, the first children's literature publication in the English-speaking Caribbean and served as its Editor-in-Chief for 10 years. At 26, she became one of the Caribbean's youngest literary editors. Anansesem has published some of the most distinctive and distinguished voices in Caribbean literature for young people including Floella Benjamin, Gerald Hausman, Ibi Zoboi, Itah Sadu, Lynn Joseph, Margarita Engle, Nadia L. Hohn, Olive Senior and Vashanti Rahaman.

Edward is second cousin to Canadian writer Dionne Brand.

Education
Edward earned a bachelor of arts degree in psychology at Temple University where she organized the College of Liberal Arts' World Voices Poetry Festival and received the Jane D. Mackler Baccalaureate Award for academic achievement. She holds a Master of Education degree in reading, writing, literacy from the University of Pennsylvania. She remained a straight-A student throughout her university career and is a lifelong Roothbert Fellow and a lifelong Phi Beta Kappa member.

Bibliography

Books for young readers
 The Wonder of the World Leaf (HarperCollins UK, 2021)
 Renaissance Man: Geoffrey Holder's Life in the Arts (Heinemann USA, 2021)
 Grannie's Coal Pot (Heinemann USA, 2021)
 The Breadfruit Bonanza (Heinemann USA, 2021)
 First Class: How Elizabeth Lange Built a School (Heinemann USA, 2021)
 Zarah and the Zemi (Heinemann USA, 2021)

Anthologies
 Caribbean Children's Literature, Volume 2: Critical Approaches (University Press of Mississippi, 2023)
 Bookmarked: New Caribbean Writing (PREE ink, 2021)
 1789: Twelve Authors Explore a Year of Rebellion, Revolution and Change (Candlewick Press, 2020)
 New Daughters of Africa: An International Anthology of Writing by Women of African Descent (Amistad/HarperCollins, 2019)
 New Worlds, Old Ways: Speculative Tales from the Caribbean (Peepal Tree Press/Peekash Press, 2016)
 Whaleheart: Journey into the Night with Maya Christina Gonzalez and 23 Courageous ArtistAuthors (Reflection Press, 2015)

Work as a children's editor
Edward worked as an independent freelance children's editor for a number of years and also worked as a children's fiction editor at Heinemann.

Literary activism
Edward has worked continuously for diversity within the children's publishing industry and as an advocate for the advancement of Caribbean children's literature. She has been a judge and editor for writing competitions, including the Golden Baobab Prizes for African children's literature, the Scholastic Art & Writing Awards, the CODE Burt Awards, and OpenIDEO's Early Childhood Book Challenge. Her writings on multicultural children's literature appear in The Horn Book Magazine, WOW Stories: Connections from the Classroom, sx salon, Charlotte Huck’s Children’s Literature: A Brief Guide, The Millions, NoveList (EBSCOhost), on the Social Justice Books website, on the International Literacy Association's website, and more. She has been invited to speak at New York University, St. Francis College, the NGC Bocas Lit Fest, the U.S. Virgin Islands Literary Festival and Book Fair, the University of the West Indies at St. Augustine, and the University of Puerto Rico, and has been recruited as a Caribbean children's literature consultant by organizations such as the Commonwealth Education Trust, At Summit Educational Services, and Caribbean Cultural Theatre. 

Edward has conducted numerous interviews with key personalities in children's publishing in the Caribbean and beyond.

References

External links
 Summer Edward official website

1986 births
Living people
University of Pennsylvania Graduate School of Education alumni
People from San Fernando, Trinidad and Tobago
Temple University alumni
University of the West Indies academics
Trinidad and Tobago women writers